A pathologic fracture is a bone fracture caused by weakness of the bone structure that leads to decrease mechanical resistance to normal mechanical loads. This process is most commonly due to osteoporosis, but may also be due to other pathologies such as cancer, infection (such as osteomyelitis), inherited bone disorders, or a bone cyst. Only a small number of conditions are commonly responsible for pathological fractures, including osteoporosis, osteomalacia, Paget's disease, Osteitis, osteogenesis imperfecta, benign bone tumours and cysts, secondary malignant bone tumours and primary malignant bone tumours.

Fragility fracture is a type of pathologic fracture that occurs as a result of an injury that would be insufficient to cause fracture in a normal bone. There are three fracture sites said to be typical of fragility fractures: vertebral fractures, fractures of the neck of the femur, and Colles fracture of the wrist. This definition arises because a normal human being ought to be able to fall from standing height without breaking any bones, and a fracture, therefore, suggests weakness of the skeleton.

Pathological fractures present as a chalkstick fracture in long bones, and appear as a transverse fractures nearly 90 degrees to the long axis of the bone. In a pathological compression fracture of a spinal vertebra fractures will commonly appear to collapse the entire body of vertebra.

Cause
Pathologic fractures in children and adolescents can result from a diverse array of disorders namely; metabolic, endocrine, neoplastic, infectious, immunologic, and genetic skeletal dysplasias. 

  Primary hyperparathyroidism
 Simple bone cyst
 Aneurismal bone cyst
 Osteoporosis
 Chronic osteomyelitis
 Osteogenesis imperfecta
 Osteomalacia
 Rickets
 Renal osteodystrophy
 Malignant infantile osteopetrosis
 juvenile osteoporosis
 juvenile rheumatoid arthritis

Miscellaneous causes
 Monostotic fibrous dysplasia
 Eosinophilic granuloma
 Bone atrophy secondary to diseases like polio

Diagnosis
In circumstances where other pathologies are excluded (for example, cancer), a pathologic fracture is diagnostic of osteoporosis irrespective of bone mineral density.

Management

Based on Mirel's score (if the score is more than 8), bone fixation should be done prophylactically. Fixation is done by internal fixation rather than conservatively, along with treatment of the underlying cause.

References

External links 

Bone fractures